The women's 200 metre freestyle swimming competition at the 1999 Pan American Games took place on 3 August 1999 at the Pan Am Pool in Winnipeg, Manitoba. The last Pan American Games champion was Cristina Teuscher of US.

This race consisted of four lengths of the pool, all in freestyle.

Results
All times are in minutes and seconds.

Heats
The first round was held on August 3.

B Final 
The B final was held on August 3.

A Final 
The A final was held on August 3.

References

Swimming at the 1999 Pan American Games
1999 in women's swimming